Artemisia Geyser is a geyser in the Upper Geyser Basin of Yellowstone National Park in the United States.

Geology 
Artemisia Geyser is part of the Cascade Group which also includes Atomizer Geyser. It erupts for a duration of 15 to 25 minutes once or twice per day. Artemisia's pool overflows quietly for many hours before an eruption, but gives no visible warning of an impending eruption until the sudden increase in overflow that marks the eruption's onset. Eruptions are accompanied by a strong underground thumping caused by steam bubbles collapsing in the geyser's channels.

Artemisia also experiences minor eruptions lasting about 5 minutes. These minor eruptions are followed by major eruptions within six hours.

In 2009, intervals between eruptions ranged from 9 to 36 hours, averaging 18 hours, 43 minutes.

References

External links
 

Geysers of Wyoming
Geothermal features of Teton County, Wyoming
Geothermal features of Yellowstone National Park
Geysers of Teton County, Wyoming